Chranišov (German: Granesau) is a village, part of the municipality of Nové Sedlo, in the Sokolov District of the Karlovy Vary Region of the Czech Republic. It is located to the south of Chodov.

Populated places in Sokolov District